Batin Shah (born 10 May 1991) is an Afghan cricketer. He made his Twenty20 debut for Speen Ghar Tigers in the 2017 Shpageeza Cricket League on 11 September 2017. He made his first-class debut for Boost Region in the 2017–18 Ahmad Shah Abdali 4-day Tournament on 26 October 2017. He made his List A debut for Kabul Region in the 2018 Ghazi Amanullah Khan Regional One Day Tournament on 10 July 2018.

References

External links
 

1991 births
Living people
Afghan cricketers
Place of birth missing (living people)
Boost Defenders cricketers
Kabul Eagles cricketers
Spin Ghar Tigers cricketers